Davina and the Vagabonds is a jazz blues band based in the Twin Cities, Minnesota and formed in 2006. The band consists of Davina Lozier (formerly Sowers), Zack Lozier (trumpet), Steve Rogness (trombone), Connor McRae Hammergren (drums), and Andrew Foreman (upright bass). Their 2014 release titled Sunshine charted at #13 on the Billboard Blues Chart. One of the singles from Sunshine, "I Would Rather Drink Muddy Water" peaked at number 21 on the Billboard Blues Digital Songs. The earlier album Black Cloud, released in 2011, was named by the Minneapolis Star & Tribune as one of the ten best releases of the year. Davina and the Vagabonds have traveled extensively throughout the United States, United Kingdom, and Europe.

Style
Davina and the Vagabonds's music consists of a New Orleans sound, featuring elements of blues, jazz, R&B, soul, and gospel. Sowers describes the sound as "unique" when attempting to put a name to it. They feature no guitar, instead using horns, piano, and drums. NPR's Marc Silver refers to the music as "rooted in early-20th-century blues and jazz, but freshened up with the 21st-century cheek of Sowers' teasing vocals and clever lyrics".

Members 
Davina Sowers (Vocals/Piano/Ukulele) Claim to fame: Singer, songwriter, bandleader and go-getter of Davina and the Vagabonds.
Zack Lozier (Trumpet/Vocals, replacing Dan Eikmeier)
Matt Hanzelka - Steve Rogness - Ben Link - (Alternating Trombone)
Connor McRae Hammergren (Drums)
Andrew Foreman/ Steve Pikal / Lucas Koehler / Chano Cruz  (Alternating Upright Bass)

Discography 
Live @ The Times (2008)
(Set/Disc 1) Track list:
 Intro
 Knock Me a Kiss
 PushPin
 Muddy Water
 Death
 This Little Light of Mine
 DayDream
 Big Fish
 Monday Date
 The Clock
 Watching the River Flow
 St. Michael vs. The Devil

(Set/Disc 2) Track list:
 Love
 Hate
 No Buts, No Maybes
 Dream a Little Dream of Me
 Put a Lid On It
 I'm Gonna Be a Wheel Someday
 Honey Pie
 St. James Infirmary
 Back To Memphis
 Under Lock and Key
 MLPS in February
 Finally Home
Recorded at The Times Bar and Cafe Minneapolis July 6–7, 2008
Black Cloud (2011)
Track list:
 Vagabond Stomp (intro)
 Black Cloud
 Disappears
 Start Running
 Sugar Moon
 PushPin
 Lipstick and Chrome
 River
 Pocket
 Let’s Bring It Back
 Bee Sting
 Crosseyed
 Carry Him With You
 Vagabond Stomp (outro)

Sunshine (2014)
Track list:
 Sunshine
 Flow
 Fizzle out
 Away From Me
I Try to Be Good
 You Better Start Prayin
 Red Shoes
 Throw It to the Wolves for Love
I’d Rather Drink Muddy Water
 You Must Be Losing Your Mind
 Heavenly Day
 Under Lock and Key

Nicollet and Tenth (2016)
Track list:
 5 ft 2
 Ain’t That A Shame
 Bee Sting
 Black Cloud
 His Eye Is On The Sparrow
 I Would Rather Go Blind
 Knock Me A Kiss
 Lipstick And Chrome
 Louisiana Fairytale
 Muddy Waters
 Pocket
 Red Shoes
 Shake That Thing 
 St James
 Start Runnin’
 Sunshine
 Travelin’ All Alone
 You Must Be Losing Your Mind
Recorded Live at the Dakota Jazz Club Minneapolis January 16–17, 2015

Sugar Drops (2019)
Track list:
 Bone Collection
 I Can't Believe I Let You Go
 Devil Horns
 Little Miss Moonshine
 Sugar Drops
 Another Lonely Day
 No Matter Where We Are
 Mr. Big Talker
 Magic Kisses
 Deep End
Recorded at Nashville’s Compass Sound Studio.

References

External links

American blues musical groups
Musical groups established in 2006
Musical groups from the Twin Cities